The Patria AMV (Armored Modular Vehicle) is an 8×8 multi-role military vehicle produced by the Finnish defence industry company Patria.

The main feature of the AMV is its modular design, which allows the incorporation of different turrets, weapons, sensors, or communications systems on the same carriage. Designs exist for different APC vehicles (armoured personnel carrier) and IFV versions (infantry fighting vehicle), communications versions, ambulances and different fire support versions, armed with large caliber mortar and gun systems. The vehicle has a very good level of mine protection and can withstand explosions of up to  TNT. The AMV has protection levels up to 30 mm APFSDS frontal arc. Another important feature is the very good mobility (combining speed, agility, and crew comfort) in rough terrain, enabled by the sophisticated but rugged hydropneumatic suspension adjusting each wheel individually.

History

The AMV stems from an investigation, made by the Finnish Army HQ in 1995, on different armored vehicle concepts. In 1996, Patria Vehicles began to develop different concept vehicles, and found the 8×8 one to be most suitable as a replacement for the 6×6 Sisu Pasi. The Finnish Defence Forces (FDF) ordered an official concept study in 1999, which was ready by 2000. Patria continued to develop the vehicle and the first AMV prototype was ready for testing in November 2001. Two evaluation samples were ordered by the FDF in December 2001, and were delivered in 2003. Later the same year, the FDF ordered 24 AMOS-equipped Patria AMVs for delivery 2006–09. The FDF also said that they were looking to order some 100 units, equipped with remote-controlled weapon stations, later placing an order for 62. In December 2002, the Polish Defence Ministry placed an order for 690 vehicles, making Patria the leading manufacturer of IFV in the 15–27 tonne range in Europe. Subsequent deals were made all over Europe, as well as in South Africa and the United Arab Emirates—in many places being locally produced. In 2004, the AMV became the first 4th generation combat vehicle of its kind to enter serial production.

The design was based on experience gained from building the Pasi and on customer feedback on that vehicle. It was entirely designed in 3D virtual environments before construction, and subsequent successful testing of the prototype showed that it fulfilled all expectations.

The vehicle was initially designed in 6×6, 8×8 and 10×10 variants, but the 10×10 variant was later dropped.

Variants

Patria AMV (first version)
The AMV is offered in three main variants: a basic platform, a high roof platform and a heavy weapon platform.

 The AMV basic platform includes APC, IFV, C2, ambulance, reconnaissance, mortar carrier, FCV, ATGM and MGS vehicles. The basic platform can also be provided as an extended Basic L platform with increased internal volume.
 The AMV high roof platform features a larger and higher rear compartment, which allows more space-requiring work to be done inside the vehicle. The AMV SP is suitable for C3, large ambulance and workshop vehicles.
 The AMV heavy weapon platform features a stronger structure, enabling the fitting of heavy weapon systems e.g. Patria AMOS 120 mm mortar turret or Mobile Gun System.

Patria AMVXP
In 2013 Patria launched a new upgraded version of AMV. In June 2014 Patria announced the name of its next generation 8×8 armoured vehicles, Patria AMVXP, which stands for Extra Payload, Extra Performance and Extra Protection.

Lockheed Patria Havoc AMV (United States)
Patria and Lockheed Martin agreed to cooperate in the competition for the US Marines MPC (Marine Personnel Carrier) program that was set to replace the LAV-25. The USMC planned to obtain 600 MPC vehicles. Patria was to deliver the AMV 8×8 vehicle. Lockheed Martin Systems Integration was responsible for the MPC offer, as well as system integration, survivability systems, the US production line, and networking and logistics. In August 2012, the Marines gave Lockheed a developmental contract for their vehicle, called the Havoc.

For protection against mine attacks, the Havoc would have used a 'subframe' rather than a V-hull. On 3 April 2013, the Havoc successfully completed amphibious testing as part of its evaluation for the MPC program.

The Marine Personnel Carrier was put on hold in June 2013, restarted in February 2014, and then restructured as Phase 1 of the Amphibious Combat Vehicle (ACV) program, which included the previous MPC competitor entries.

During the summer of 2013, the Havoc successfully completed protection systems testing during a series of blast tests. The vehicle completed all threshold and objective protection system testing, with instrumentation indicating that no disabling injuries would have resulted to any of the three crew members and nine dismounted Marines. Lockheed also delivered a report demonstrating the high degree of commonality between the Havoc and other Marine Corps vehicles, aimed at reducing cost, training requirements, and logistics needs.

The Lockheed Havoc AMV completed the Nevada Automotive Test Center's Butte Mountain Trail course in September 2014. Lockheed planned to offer the Havoc in the Marine Corps' ACV Phase 1 program, and give them 16 vehicles to test once a Request for Proposals (RFP) was released in early 2015. However, in July 2015 partnership between Patria and Lockheed Martin came to an end, and Havoc was not offered to the Amphibious Combat Vehicle program.

Other variants
The Slovenian variant "SKOV Svarun" uses a specially designed hydraulic door. The new door also features additional carrying space for ammunition, two RPG-type anti-tank weapons and a general purpose machinegun.
The South African 'Badger' variant, equipped with an underfloor armour package from Land Mobility Technologies (LMT) and Denel Land Systems's Modular Combat Turret (MCT). Offered in Section, Fire Support, Mortar, Command and Missile sub-variants. Due to various factors, eg mismanagement of the project and involvement by the Guptas brothers and associates, it was never taken into South African service.
The UAE variant is slightly lengthened (0.4 m longer) to allow fitting of the more spacious BMP-3 turret and the same number of soldiers as the original AMV model.
BAE partnered with Patria to offer the AMV35, a version of the AMV with an E35 turret from the CV9035 to create a combat reconnaissance vehicle for the Australian Army’s Land 400 Phase 2 mounted combat reconnaissance requirement.

Service

The Polish Army has ordered 690 vehicles in 2003, including 313 AMVs with the Italian Oto Melara 30 mm Hitfist-30P turret and 377 AMVs in various other configurations to be delivered between 2004 and 2013. Some of the Polish vehicles were deployed in Afghanistan. The Polish vehicles are known as KTO Rosomak ("wolverine") in Polish Army service. In 2013 the Polish army ordered 307 more vehicles, including 122 AMVs and 80 mortars, totaling 997 units making Poland the largest operator by a fair margin. The Vehicles are built in Poland under the licence. In 2017 Polish Ministry of Defence said that production of KTO Rosomak is now 100% based in Poland.

The Finnish Army has ordered 24 AMVs fitted with the AMOS mortar system and 62 AMVs fitted with Protector (RWS) remote weapon system for the .50 M2HB QCB heavy machine gun or the GMG grenade machine gun. The standard version is known as XA-360 in Finnish Army service, while the AMOS version is known as XA-361.

In June 2006, the Slovenian Ministry of Defence declared that the Patria AMV would be the new armoured fighting vehicle of the Slovenian Armed Forces. Patria will supply 135 vehicles, some equipped with the NEMO mortar, some with Elbit 30 mm remote controlled weapon station and the rest with Kongsberg Protector turrets. Allegations in the Finnish media that Patria used bribery to secure the Slovenian contract led to a scandal and a criminal investigation in Finland and may have contributed to the defeat of Prime Minister Janez Janša in the 2008 Slovenian parliamentary elections. Due to the financial crisis, the defence budget was cut several times. At first, the contract to supply 135 vehicles should have been amended to have less vehicles with better armament. Later on, the defence ministry suffered from even bigger financial cuts. In 2012, the Defence Minister announced the termination of the contract, by which time 30 vehicles had been received. More armored vehicles and higher calibre weapons are to be bought in the mid-term future.

In May 2007, the South African Denel Land Systems was awarded a contract to build an improved version of the AMV, with a high level of ballistic and mine protection for the South African National Defence Force. The AMV will replace South-African Ratels as part of the "Project Hoefyster" (Horseshoe). Five different versions are included: Command, Mortar, Missile, Section and Fire Support vehicles. In November 2013, Denel Land Systems and Patria announced that they have signed an agreement regarding Patria AMV 8×8 armoured wheeled vehicle serial production and delivery to South Africa. The agreement includes 238 vehicles, out of which 5 pre-series vehicles have already been delivered during the development phase.

In July 2007, the Croatian Ministry of Defence selected the Patria AMV as the new armoured fighting vehicle of the Armed Forces of the Republic of Croatia in their first international tender in its history. 84 AMVs will be supplied. Initially, the plan called for 84 8×8 vehicles and 42 6×6 vehicles. The Croatian Ministry of Defence has approved the purchase of 84 Patria AMV 8×8 vehicles. The 6×6 configuration idea was scrapped, and the remaining 42 vehicles were decided to be 8×8s. The purchase of the remaining 42 AMVs was made in December 2008. Due to the financial crisis, the contract was slightly amended in April 2010. There was an initial plan of shelving the order by a half (64 vehicles were mentioned) but it was decided that the total of 126 units would remain on order. However, in order to somewhat decrease the cost of the deal, the most expensive variants like the NEMO or engineering units will probably be replaced by less costly APC variants. On the other hand, the production will be sped up and all vehicles are to be delivered by the end of 2012.

The government of the Republic of North Macedonia announced in 2006 that it would procure the same type that the Croatian military chooses after test trials in 2007—as this would be a less expensive than conducting trials of their own. The configuration of Patria vehicles that eventually win the competition will be similar to those in Slovenian service, but probably in smaller numbers. However, any contract has not been published.

In January 2008, Patria announced that the United Arab Emirates armed forces had ordered the AMV, equipped with the BMP-3 turret. The number of vehicles is yet to be announced.

On 30 January 2008, it was announced that Patria has offered to deliver 30 first AMVs within four months of ordering, if the Czech Army chooses AMV as its next APC. The Czech army had earlier chosen the Austrian Steyr Pandur as their next APC, but the Czech government withdrew from the deal at the end of last year, citing Steyr's failure to fulfill the commitments ensuing from the contract.

In August 2010, Patria sold 113 AMVs to Sweden in a deal worth 250 million Euros. The deal included an option for another 113 vehicles in the future.

Combat history

War in Afghanistan (2001–2014)
The Polish Land Forces contingent, which is a part of the International Security Assistance Force, has been operating 35 (later raised to 128) KTO Rosomak vehicles (including 5 medevac) in Afghanistan since 2007. The APCs were equipped with additional steel-composite armour. In early 2008, a Polish Rosomak serving in Afghanistan (the version with upgraded armour) was attacked by Taliban rebels. The vehicle was hit with RPG-7 rockets but it managed to fire back and returned to base without any help required. In June 2008, a Rosomak was attacked by Taliban and was hit in its frontal armour with an RPG which didn't penetrate the armour. In 2009, the first soldier was reported killed while traveling in a Rosomak after an IED exploded under the vehicle causing it to roll over and crushing the gunner who had been standing in the open turret. Similar explosions caused by mines and IEDs have occurred before though they have failed to inflict casualties.
In October 2010, a platoon of Svarun vehicles was sent to Afghanistan to support the Slovenian OMLT.

European Union mission in Chad (2008–2009)
European Union Force Chad/CAR used 16 KTO Rosomak (including 2 medevac).

Saudi Arabia and United Arab Emirates-led intervention in Yemen (2015–present)
United Arab Emirates Army used 8×8 Patria AMVs fitted with remotely operated turrets in an offensive along the west coast of Yemen.

Operators

Current operators

 126 units currently entering service, 84 ordered in 2007 and additional 42 in December 2008, first 4 vehicles delivered in December 2008. Due to a military budget cut, the order was slightly amended in April 2010, but the total number of 126 units was not changed. All vehicles are to be delivered by late 2012. Croatia is likely to order number of new Patria due to requirements for Medium Brigade, up to 42 additional Patria AMV armed with Elbit UT30MK2 turrets could be ordered before 2025, eventually 160 Patria AMV could be in service with the army.
 62 standard APCs equipped with Kongsberg turrets and 18 armoured wheeled mortar carriers equipped with the AMOS mortar system.
 1197 APCs and amphibious AFVs. Manufactured under license at Rosomak S.A, marked as KTO Rosomak (transl. wheeled armored personnel carrier "Wolverine"). All of the ordered vehicles were delivered by 2019. In 2013 the original order for 359 IFVs and 331 base vehicles was increased by 307 units—including 122 IFVs with new turret. In 2013 there were a total of 570 vehicles in service In January 2015, the Polish army placed an order for 200 additional vehicles. This brought the total number of vehicles in operation up to 977.

 In March 2022 the Slovakian Ministry of Defence selected Finland and Patria AMVxp 8x8 as BOV 8x8 programme tender winner. 76 vehicles, new version of Patria AMVXP ordered and being delivered.

 30 vehicles that had already been delivered, due to economic and legal questions.
 238 units. Designated Badger. There will be five versions: a standard infantry carrier, a command car, fire support variant, mortar carrier and tank hunter.

 Sweden made an order for 113 vehicles, and had an option for the same number of vehicles, but a Swedish court ordered the competition to be re-done. On 13 August 2010 the new competition ended in the same result as the original competition with Sweden ordering 113 vehicles from Patria. The first vehicles were delivered on 5 March 2013.
 The United Arab Emirates Army ordered an initial evaluation batch of 15 vehicles. These vehicles will be equipped with BMP-3 turrets and have therefore been slightly modified, including a somewhat longer hull. In January 2016, the General Headquarters of the UAE armed forces ordered 40 Patria AMV hulls with the option of 50 more. The vehicles were shipped in June 2016 from Patria's Polish production line. The Patrias are used in Yemen in combat operations.

Future operators
  - It was reported on 16 December 2020 that two Patria AMVXP 8×8 vehicles are being sent to Japan from Finland for field tests to participate in the Next Wheeled Armored Vehicle project under the Japanese Ministry of Defense. From December 15, 2021, the MOD has started field tests to asertain the vehicle and an unnamed armored vehicle made by Mitsubishi Heavy Industries. On December 9, 2022, the Japanese Ministry of Defense awarded a contract for the AMV through Patria Japan.

Potential future operators
  Bulgarian Land Forces — The Patria AMV and more recently (as of 2017) Patria AMVXP is a strong contender for the order in the new Bulgarian project for a new type of wheeled IFV. The project initially called for a total of 238 vehicles in different variants (of them 100 in combat variant, the rest in combat support (reconnaissance, combat engineer etc.) and combat service support variants (MedEvac etc.)). In the end of 2016 the Bulgarian Ministry of Defence re-examined the conditions and out of budget considerations reduced the number of combat vehicles to 90. Additionally the requirement that the combat, CS and CSS variants should be of one standard platform was dropped. The new baseline of the project calls for 90 combat vehicles and 108 supporting vehicles for a total cost of 1.22 billion BGN or about €600 million. RfI-letters have been sent to General Dynamics Land System – MOWAG (for the Piranha V and the Pandur II), NEXTER Group (for the VBCI), Patria Oy (for the Patria AMV and Patria AMVXP, both have been demonstrated in the country), Rheinmetall Defence AG (for the Boxer), Textron (a joint offer together with Rheinmetall Defence AG for the Boxer in the combat role and Commando Select assembled in Bulgaria in the combat support and combat service support roles. Textron also offered its own 6x6 prototype in the combat role, but due to its still unproven status it is considered the weakest alternative), Iveco-Leonardo Defence System (for the B1 Centauro in the updated 120mm B2 version) and Krauss-Maffei Wegman GmbH (also for the Boxer). In the beginning of 2017 the defence minister in the Gerdzhikov caretaker government has decided, that RfI-letters should be sent to 7 additional companies, but of them only Otokar (for the Arma), FNSS (for the Pars) and WMZ (for the KTO Rosomak) were credible contenders. The forerunners in the competition as of the end of 2017 are the Piranha V, the Patria AMVXP and the Otokar Arma. Patria Group has expressed willingness to involve Bulgarian defence sector companies as subcontractors in the production not only of eventual Bulgarian vehicles, but also for export markets.

Failed bids 
  Australian Army — BAE Systems Australia and Land 400 bid partner Patria were confirmed as one of two tenders selected to take part in the 12-month Risk Mitigation Activity for the Australian Army's Land 400 Phase 2 combat reconnaissance vehicle program. The other tender was the German-Dutch BOXER IFV. The German BOXER was announced as the winner on 13 March 2018.

Evaluation-only operators
  - The Patria AMV partook in the Amphibious Combat Vehicle trials in the US. Lockheed Martin partnered with Patria offering the AMV under the name Havoc, but ended cooperation with Patria and offered a different vehicle for the program in July 2015. In 2016, LM introduced a new ACV armored vehicle.

Museum exhibits
 Parola Tank Museum, Hattula, 1 APC variant with Kongsberg turret and 1 AMOS mock-up

See also 
 Patria NEMO  (amphibious)
 AMOS

Comparable systems
 Boxer
 CM-32
 Type 08  (amphibious)
 Dragon (armored vehicle)
 Eitan AFV
 Iveco SuperAV  (amphibious)
 Otokar Arma  (amphibious)
 K808 White Tiger  (amphibious)
 VPK-7829 Bumerang  (amphibious)
 Pandur II  (amphibious)

References

External links
 Patria AMV official website
 Official LM ACV page

Armoured personnel carriers of Finland
Post–Cold War military vehicles of Finland
Military vehicles introduced in the 2000s
Armoured personnel carriers of Poland
Armoured personnel carriers of Slovakia
Wheeled armoured fighting vehicles

Eight-wheeled vehicles
Amphibious armoured personnel carriers
Wheeled amphibious armoured fighting vehicles
Armoured personnel carriers of the post–Cold War period